The 1881 John M. Moyer House was built by Linn County, Oregon, pioneer John Moyer. The house was donated to the Linn County Historical Society in 1962 under a grant from the Hill Family Foundation. The Society has furnished the house with late 19th-century Victorian pieces and offers tours on weekends.

In 1974 the Moyer House was placed on the National Register of Historic Places.

A carpenter by trade, Moyer began planning the house in 1878 in the Italian villa style. George F. Colbert, a friend of Moyer, helped with construction.

References

External links
 Moyer House - Linn County Parks & Recreation

Houses on the National Register of Historic Places in Oregon
National Register of Historic Places in Linn County, Oregon
Brownsville, Oregon
Houses completed in 1881
Italianate architecture in Oregon
Houses in Linn County, Oregon
Museums in Linn County, Oregon
Historic house museums in Oregon
1881 establishments in Oregon